The Hierodulinae are a subfamily of praying mantids, originally used by Brunner von Wattenwyl.  It was restored as part of a major revision of mantid taxonomy, and now contains genera previously placed elsewhere in the family Mantidae.

The new placement means that this taxon is part of the superfamily Mantoidea (of group Cernomantodea) and infraorder Schizomantodea.  Species have been recorded from: Africa, Asia and Australia.

Tribes and genera 
This subfamily now contains many genera that were previously placed elsewhere including the Mantinae.  The Mantodea Species File lists two tribes here:

Archimantini 

 subtribe Archimantina
 Archimantis Saussure, 1869
 Austromantis Sjostedt, 1918
 Austrovates Sjostedt, 1918
 Coenomantis Giglio-Tos, 1917
 Corthylomantis Milledge, 1997
 Nullabora Tindale, 1923
 subtribe Pseudomantina
 Pseudomantis Saussure, 1869
 subtribe Trachymantina
 Sphodropoda Stal, 1871
 Trachymantis Giglio-Tos, 1917
 Zopheromantis Tindale, 1924

Hierodulini 
 Camelomantis Giglio-Tos, 1917
 Chlorocalis Stiewe, Shcherbakov & Vermeersch, 2019
 Dracomantis – monotypic D. mirofraternus Shcherbakov & Vermeersch, 2020
 Ephierodula Giglio-Tos, 1912
 Gretella – monotypic G. gracilis Werner, 1923
 Hierodula Burmeister, 1838
 Hierodulella Giglio-Tos, 1912
 Mekongomantis – monotypic M. quinquespinosa Schwarz, Ehrmann & Shcherbakov, 2018
 Pnigomantis Giglio-Tos, 1917 – monotypic P. medioconstricta Westwood, 1889
 Rhombodera Burmeister, 1838
 Rhombomantis Ehrmann & Borer, 2015
 Stictomantis Beier, 1942 – monotypic S. cinctipes Werner, 1916
 Tamolanica Werner, 1923
 Tismomorpha Roy, 1973
Titanodula

References

External links 
 
 

Mantodea subfamilies
Hierodulinae